Beth Wiseman is an American writer from Texas.

List of publications 

Daughters of Promise:
 Plain Perfect (2008)
 Plain Pursuit (2009)
 Plain Promise (2009)
 Plain Paradise (2010)
 Plain Proposal (2011)
 Plain Peace (2013)
 Daughters of the Promise Box Set Volumes 1-3 (omnibus) (2009)
 The Daughters of the Promise Collection (omnibus) (2013)
 The Complete Daughters of the Promise Collection (omnibus) (2014)

Land of Canaan:
 Seek Me with All Your Heart (2010)
 The Wonder of Your Love (2011)
 His Love Endures Forever (2012)
 Seek Me with All Your Heart / The Wonder of Your Love (omnibus) (2012)
 The Land of Canaan Collection (omnibus) (2015)

Amish Secrets:
 Her Brother's Keeper (2013)
 Love Bears All Things (2016)

Amish Year:
 A Love for Irma Rose (2015)
 Patchwork Perfect (2015)
An Amish Year (2015)

Surf's Up:
 A Tide Worth Turning (2015)
 Message In A Bottle (2016)
 A Tide Worth Turning / Message In a Bottle (2016)

Novels:

 Divine Freefall (2000)
Need You Now (2012)
The House that Love Built (2012)
The Promise (2014)

Omnibus:

 An Amish Christmas (2009) (with Barbara Cameron, Kathleen Fuller and Kelly Long)
 Plain Perfect / Quaker Summer (2009) (with Lisa Samson)
 An Amish Love (2010) (with Kathleen Fuller and Kelly Long)
 Healing Hearts (2010)
 An Amish Wedding (2011) (with Kathleen Fuller and Kelly Long)
 An Amish Kitchen (2012) (with Amy Clipston and Kelly Long)
 An Amish Miracle (2013) (with Mary Ellis and Ruth Reid)
 A Beth Wiseman Amish Collection (2014)
 An Amish Cradle (2015)

Novellas:
 A Change of Heart (2012)
 A Choice to Forgive (2012)
 A Recipe for Hope (2013)
 A Perfect Plan (2013)
 Always Beautiful (2013)
 In His Father's Arms (2015)

Series contributed to:

 Amish Gathering (with Barbara Cameron and Kathleen Fuller)
 An Amish Gathering (omnibus) (2009)

Year of Weddings:
 A July Bride (2014)
 A Year of Weddings (2014) (with Debra Clopton, Katie Ganshert, Rachel Hauck, Denise Hunter, Meg Moseley, Deborah Raney, Betsy St Amant, Kathryn Springer, Beth K Vogt, Marybeth Whalen and Lenora Worth)
 Summer Brides (omnibus) (2015) (with Debra Clopton and Marybeth Whalen)
 Amish Garden:
 An Amish Garden (omnibus) (2014) (with Vannetta Chapman, Kathleen Fuller and Tricia Goyer)
 Rooted in Love (2014)

Amish Second Christmas:
 An Amish Second Christmas (omnibus) (2014) (with Kathleen Fuller, Tricia Goyer and Ruth Reid)
 When Christmas Comes Again (2014)

Amish Harvest:
 An Amish Harvest (omnibus) (2016) (with Vannetta Chapman, Amy Clipston and Kathleen Fuller)
 Under the Harvest Moon (2016)

References

External links 
 http://bethwiseman.com

21st-century American non-fiction writers
Writers from Texas
American Christian writers
American women journalists
Living people
Year of birth missing (living people)
21st-century American women writers